KPLO-FM (94.5 FM, "Everything Country") is a radio station licensed to serve Reliance, South Dakota.  The station is owned by James River Broadcasting, branded as DRG Media Group. It airs a country music format. All four Pierre DRG Media Group (James River Broadcasting) stations share studios on West Pleasant Drive in Pierre.

The station was assigned the KPLO-FM call letters by the Federal Communications Commission on February 20, 1985.

KPLO-FM's tower, shared with former sister station KPLO-TV, collapsed during an ice storm on January 22, 2010. As of February 8, KPLO was back on the air in the Pierre and Fort Pierre area at 100.5 FM.

References

External links
KPLO-FM official website

PLO-FM
Lyman County, South Dakota
Radio stations established in 1985
1985 establishments in South Dakota